Division 5 is the seventh level in the league system of Swedish football and comprises 47 sections with 9 to 16 football teams in each.

The competition 
There are 47 groups of 9 to 16 teams each representing a local geographical area. During the course of a season (starting in April and ending in October) each club plays the others twice, once at their home ground and once at that of their opponents, for a total of 18 to 22 games depending on the number of teams. The top team in each Division 5 group is promoted to Division 4 and the second placed teams may also be promoted or participate in the promotion/relegation play-offs. The bottom two teams in each Division 5 group are normally relegated to Division 6.

Administration
The District Football Associations are responsible for the administration of Division 5. The Swedish Football Association is responsible for the administration of Division 3 and the higher tiers of the Swedish football league system.

References 

   
7